The following are the appointments to various Canadian Honours of 2012. Usually, they are announced as part of the New Year and Canada Day celebrations and are published within the Canada Gazette during year. This follows the custom set out within the United Kingdom which publishes its appoints of various British Honours for New Year's and for monarch's official birthday. However, instead of the midyear appointments announced on Victoria Day, the official birthday of the Canadian Monarch, this custom has been transferred with the celebration of Canadian Confederation and the creation of the Order of Canada.

As the Canada Gazette publishes appointment to various orders, decorations and medal, either Canadian or from Commonwealth and foreign states, this article will reference all Canadians so honoured during the 2012 calendar year.

Provincial Honours are not listed within the Canada Gazette, however they are listed within the various publications of each provincial government. Provincial honours are listed within the page.

2012 was also the year of the Diamond Jubilee of Queen Elizabeth II, Queen of Canada. 60,000 Canadians had been awarded with the Queen Elizabeth II Diamond Jubilee Medal during this anniversary year.

The Order of Canada

Companions of the Order of Canada

 The Honourable Ian Corneil Binnie, C.C.
 Natalie Zemon Davis, C.C.
 The Right Honourable Paul Edgar Philippe Martin, P.C., C.C.
 Yannick Nézet-Séguin, C.C.

Officer of the Order of Canada

 Robert G. Bertram, O.C.
 Jean Bissonnette, O.C.
 Francine Décary, O.C., O.Q.
 Elizabeth Dowdeswell, O.C.
 Angèle Dubeau, O.C., C.Q. - This is a promotion within the Order
 Paul Hoffman, O.C.
 Prabhat Jha, O.C.

 Ralph Klein, O.C., A.O.E.
 Maryse Lassonde, O.C., C.Q.
 John Last, O.C.
 Jean-François Lépine, O.C.
 Hadi-Khan Mahabadi, O.C.
 Ermanno Mauro, O.C.
 Marianne McKenna, O.C.
 Craig Oliver, O.C.
 The Honourable P. Michael Pitfield, P.C., O.C., C.V.O.
 Sharon Pollock, O.C.

 John Brian Patrick (Pat) Quinn, O.C.
 The Honourable John D. Richard, O.C.
 Cecil H. Rorabeck, O.C.
 Louise Roy, O.C., O.Q.
 Gordon Semenoff, O.C.

 Chantal St-Cyr Hébert, O.C.
 Gilles Tremblay, O.C., O.Q.
 The Honourable Marilyn Trenholme Counsell, O.C., D.St.J., O.N.B.

 General Maurice Baril, O.C., C.M.M., M.S.M., C.D. (Retired)
 The Honourable James Bartleman, O.C., O.Ont.
 Aldo Albert Daniel Bensadoun, O.C.

 Lieutenant-General Joseph Jacques Charles Bouchard, O.C., C.M.M., M.S.C., C.D.
 William Scott Bowman, O.C.
 Alain Dubuc, O.C.
 Robert R. Fowler, O.C.
 Donald A. S. Fraser, O.C.
 Gordon Guyatt, O.C.

 General Rick J. Hillier, O.C., C.M.M., M.S.C., C.D. (Retired)
 P. Thomas (Tom) Jenkins, O.C.
 Hugh A. Krentz, O.C.
 Bruce Kuwabara, O.C.

 The Honourable Kevin G. Lynch, P.C., O.C.
 R. Peter MacKinnon, O.C.
 James McEwen, O.C.
 Stuart McLean, O.C.
 Jean-Jacques Nattiez, O.C., C.Q. - This is a promotion within the Order
 Charles Pachter, O.C. - This is a promotion within the Order
 Catherine Robbin, O.C.
 Seymour Schulich, O.C.
 David W. Scott, O.C.
 Jeffrey Skoll, O.C.
 Calvin Ralph Stiller, O.C., O.Ont. - This is a promotion within the Order
 Yuli Turovsky, O.C., C.Q.

 Brian Williams, O.C.
 Tim Wynne-Jones, O.C.
 Alvin Zipursky, O.C.

Members of the Order of Canada
 Carolyn Acker, C.M.
 Dyane Adam, C.M.
 Patsy Anderson, C.M.
 Allan Gordon Bell, C.M.
 Arthur Norman Bielfeld, C.M.
 Roger Bland, C.M.
 Robert Bourne, C.M.

 Pierre Bruneau, C.M., O.Q.
 John Buhler, C.M.
 Silver Donald Cameron, C.M.
 Stephen Chatman, C.M.
 Guy Corneau, C.M.
 Franklin Delaney, C.M.
 Wadih M. Fares, C.M.
 Anthony (Tony) Fields, C.M.
 Allan Gotlib, C.M.
 Michel Goulet, C.M.
 Alia Hogben, C.M.
 Greg Hollingshead, C.M.
 Nancy Kilgour, C.M.
 Henry Kloppenburg, C.M.
 Merril Knudtson, C.M.
 The Honourable Frances Lankin, P.C., C.M.
 Louis LaPierre, C.M.
 William Laskin, C.M.
 Monique F. Leroux, C.M.
 Guy Maddin, C.M., O.M.
 Salem Masry, C.M.
 Kenneth Maybee, C.M., O.M.M., C.D.
 Des McAnuff, C.M.
 Elizabeth McWeeny, C.M.
 Lois Mitchell, C.M.
 Bernice Morgan, C.M.
 Marian Packham, C.M.
 Gordon Rawlinson, C.M.
 Jean-Guy Rioux, C.M.
 Michèle Rouleau, C.M., C.Q.
 Marie Saint Pierre, C.M., C.Q.
 Emanuele (Lino) Saputo, C.M., O.Q.
 Steven Schipper, C.M.
 Cyril Simard, C.M., O.Q.
 Laure Waridel, C.M.
 Miriam Adams, C.M.
 Archibald (Archie) Alleyne, C.M.
 Cheryl Bartlett, C.M.
 Hans-Ludwig Blohm, C.M.
 Margaret Bloodworth, C.M.
 Lawrence S. Bloomberg, C.M., O.Ont.
 Benoît Bouchard, C.M.
 France Chrétien Desmarais, C.M.
 Jocelyne Côté-O'Hara, C.M.
 Tom Dawe, C.M.
 Jean Deslauriers, C.M.
 Daphne E. Dumont, C.M.
 John T. Ferguson, C.M.
 Mary Ferguson-Paré, C.M.
 Joella Foulds, C.M.
 Mary Margaret Hetherington, C.M.
 Noel Pattison James, C.M.
 Ana Paula Lopes, C.M.
 Denis Losier, C.M.
 Leslie (Les) Manning, C.M.
 Michael Meaney, C.M., C.Q.
 David Northcott, C.M., O.M.
 Ratna Omidvar, C.M., O.Ont.
 Aaju Peter, C.M.
 Samuel Pierre, C.M., C.Q.
 Sean Riley, C.M.
 Pierrette Robitaille, C.M.
 Nigel Rusted, C.M., O.N.L.
 Kathy Sendall, C.M.
 Louise Sicuro, C.M.
 Margaret Spoelstra, C.M.
 Anita Stewart, C.M.
 Claude St-Laurent, C.M.
 Garnette Sutherland, C.M.
 Donald John Taylor, C.M.
 Maïr Verthuy, C.M.
 Bernard Zinman, C.M.

Order of Merit of the Police Forces

Commander of the Order of Merit of the Police Forces

 Chief William Sterling Blair (This is a promotion within the Order.)

Officers of the Order of Merit of the Police Forces
 Assistant Commissioner Roger L. Brown
 Chief Constable Michael Robert Chadwick
 Superintendent Mario Di Tommaso
 Chief Robert Philip Johnston
 Deputy Chief Constable Douglas A. LePard (This is a promotion within the Order.)
 Chief Thomas Mathew McKenzie
 Chief Stephen J. Tanner
 Chief Matthew A. Torigian

Members of the Order of Merit of the Police Forces
 Inspector William A. Renton
 Sergeant Jocelyn April
 Mr. Alexandre Beaudoin
 Maître Francis Brabant
 Staff Sergeant Patrick Adrian Cahill
 Sergeant François Caron
 Assistant Director General François Charpentier
 Superintendent Deborah Clark
 Deputy Chief Andrew M. Fletcher
 Chief Inspector Yves Guay
 Sergeant Mark Houldworth
 Deputy Chief Constable Richard John Lucy
 Sergeant Michael J. MacDonald
 Constable Linda A. Malcolm
 Sergeant Mike Novakowski
 Inspector Trent Rolfe
 Sergeant Daniel Patrick Russell
 Inspector Sean Ryan
 Superintendent John Schmidt
 Detective Constable Jonathan P. R. Sheldan
 Superintendent William Stewart
 Chief Superintendent Richard Bruce Taylor
 Deputy Chief S. Brent Thomlison
 Inspector Scott A. Thompson
 Inspector Richard Wayne Votour
 Deputy Chief Alan Williams

Erratum
 The notice published on page 746 of the March 24, 2012, issue of the Canada Gazette, Part I, is hereby amended as follows: Member of the Order of Merit of the Police Forces, as of January 5, 2012 to Sergeant John Mark Houldsworth

Royal Victorian Order

Lieutenant of the Royal Victorian Order
 Herbert Allen Le Roy

Member of the Royal Victorian Order
 Rosemary Doyle-Morier
 William John Edward Stewart

Most Venerable Order of the Hospital of St. John of Jerusalem

Bailiff Grand Cross of the Order of St. John
 Frederick Richard Bruce, MOM, Brandon, MB

Knights and Dames of the Order of St. John
 Mairi Christina Arthur, Bedford, NS - This is a promotion within the Order
 Lieutenant-Colonel Daniel Sutherland Campbell Mackay, OMM, CD, Ottawa, ON
 His Honour, the Honourable Brigadier General (Retired) John James Grant, CMM, CD, Halifax, NS
 Her Honour, the Honourable Vaughn Solomon Schofield, SOM, Winnipeg, MB

Commanders of the Order of St. John
 Kirk Woodruff Corkery, CD, Richmond Hill, ON - This is a promotion within the Order
 Teresa Kim Kwong, Calgary, AB - This is a promotion within the Order
 Andrea Libby, Fredericton, NB - This is a promotion within the Order
 Mia Michelle Nagasaki, Alliston, ON - This is a promotion within the Order
 Corporal (Retired) Alvin Reginald Windley, CD, Calgary, AB - This is a promotion within the Order
 Douglas Gordon Labron, Brockville, ON
 Terrence Howard Wardrop, Burlington, ON

Officers of the Order of St. John
 Alan Thomas Blundell, Mississauga, ON - This is a promotion within the Order
 Laurence Cheng, Vancouver, BC - This is a promotion within the Order
 The Venerable Edward Norman Dallow, CD, Kingston, ON - This is a promotion within the Order
 Les Johnson, Ottawa, ON - This is a promotion within the Order
 Joseph Paul Andre Roger Lavallee, CD, Brighton, ON - This is a promotion within the Order
 Nancy Diane Mattinson, Kingston, NS - This is a promotion within the Order
 Major Larry McMorran, CD, Dundas, ON - This is a promotion within the Order
 Carol Elizabeth Parsons, Mount Pearl, NL - This is a promotion within the Order
 Major Joseph John Petozzi, CD, Binbrook, ON - This is a promotion within the Order
 Katelyn Rose Szlater, Calgary, AB - This is a promotion within the Order 
 Peter Tang, Vancouver, BC - This is a promotion within the Order
 Gerald Joseph Antle Jr., Goulds, NL
 James William Carroll, Logy Bay, NL
 Captain Jason Brent English, MMM, CD, Winnipeg, MB
 Donna Marie Hansen, CD, Ottawa, ON
 Leslie Helen Jack, Grimsby, ON
 Alain Laurencelle, Winnipeg, MB
 Linda Oakes, Guelph, ON
 Wayne Albert Purchase, Conception Bay South, NL
 Sergeant Brent Kenneth Schriner, CD, Hamilton, ON
 Colonel Richard Brian Stasuik, CD, Nanaimo, BC

Members of the Order of St. John
 Sergeant (Retired) Stephen Gerald Andrews, CD, Trenton, ON
 Gary Edwin Ashby, Porter's Lake, NS
 Master Seaman Heather Frances Bardell, CD, Kingston, ON
 Stèven Bélanger, Baie-Comeau, QC
 Allan Burnell Bird, CD, Manotick, ON
 Karine Dufresne, Montréal, QC
 Major Dean Paul Gresko, CD, Thunder Bay, ON
 Josephine Hall, Nepean, ON
 Jacques Janson, Ottawa, ON
 Donald Richard Jellie, Courtenay, BC
 Patricia Katherine Kearney, Ottawa, ON
 Beverly Eileen Lafortune, Edmonton, AB
 Maxime Lefebvre, Saint-Jérôme, QC
 Ian Joseph MacIntyre, Halifax, NS
 Walter William Makortoff, Heffley Creek, BC
 Kristeen McKee, Sudbury, ON
 Holly Jane McKenzie, Barrie, ON
 Jane Elizabeth McLaren, Cornwall, ON
 Honorary Colonel John Buckingham Newman, Toronto, ON
 Dennis O'Grady, Grand Falls-Windsor, NL
 Reverend Lloyd O'Neill, Halifax, NS
 Sebastien Rheaume, Rawdon, QC
 Margaret Helen Sidney, Kamloops, BC
 Jennifer Lyn Simpson, Woodstock, ON
 Lieutenant Ian Charles Steingaszner, Snowball, ON
 Andrew Wilder, Owen Sound, ON
 William Wood, Moncton, NB
 Christine Ann Armstrong, Winnipeg, MB
 Russell Grant Austin, Martensville, SK
 Richard Nevin Ball, St. Marys, ON
 Shannon-Lee Marlene Barry, Winnipeg, MB
 Captain Amy Lynn Belbin, Brockville, ON
 Darrel Francis Forbes Brown, Winnipeg, MB
 Major Steven Mark Daniel, Yellowknife, NT
 Glenys Deanna May Dlugosch, Mount Pearl, NL
 Noreen Flynn, Paradise, NL
 Anne Louise Grundy, Kingston, ON
 Raylene Marie Jonassen, Winnipeg, MB
 Deborah Anne Kelly, Windsor, ON
 Jennifer Kotsamanes, Cambridge, ON
 Armand Paul Labarge, Bethany, ON
 Renee Elizabeth McCormick, Sudbury, ON
 Judith McIlwaine, Bath, ON
 Brian Metcalfe, St. John's, NL
 Dawn Mohammed, Winnipeg, MB
 James Allan Osborn, Windsor, ON
 Darrell William Petite, Kingston, ON
 Larry Poulin-Carreau, Beauceville, QC
 Elizabeth Jean Purssell, Kingston, ON
 Debra Susan Roskam, Brandon, MB
 Cynthia Jean Russell, Cambridge, ON
 Malcolm Tinsley, Winnipeg, MB
 Joseph Bruce Varner, Ottawa, ON

Erratum
 The notice published on page 1963 of the June 25, 2011, issue of the Canada Gazette, Part I, is hereby amended as follows: Promotion as an Officers of the Order of St. John as of December 15, 2010, to Lieutenant-Colonel Daniel Richard Stepaniuk, CD, Dundas, ON

Provincial Honours

National Order of Québec

Grand Officers of the National Order of Québec
 JEAN-LOUIS BAUDOUIN, G.O.Q
 JACQUELINE DESMARAIS, G.O.Q

Officers of the National Order of Québec

 PIERRE BOURGIE, O.Q
 André Bureau, O.Q
 Daniel Gauthier, O.Q
 Bartha Knoppers, O.Q
 NANCY NEAMTAN, O.Q
 Béatrice Picard, O.Q
 JEAN-CLAUDE POITRAS, O.Q
 NORBERT RODRIGUE, O.Q
 Geneviève Salbaing, O.Q
 LOUIS TAILLEFER, O.Q
 MAURICE TANGUAY, O.Q

Honorary Officer of the National Order of Québec

 Bertrand Delanoë, O.Q

Knight of the National Order of Québec

 VINCENT ASSELIN, C.Q
 PATRICE BIRON, C.Q
 Michel Marc Bouchard, C.Q
 Isabelle Boulay, C.Q
 LOUISE CHAMPOUX-PAILLÉ, C.Q
 Arlette Cousture, C.Q
 Léonie Couture, C.Q
 GHISLAIN GAGNON, C.Q
 YVAN GUINDON, C.Q
 WAGDI GEORGE HABASHI, C.Q
 ACHILLE HUBERT, C.Q
 Jacques Joli-Cœur, C.Q
 GILLES KÈGLE, C.Q
 Jacques Lacombe, C.Q
 ANDRÉ LAURIN, C.Q
 Werner Nold, C.Q
 FRÉDÉRIC PELLERIN, C.Q
 CLAUDE VALLIÈRES, C.Q

Saskatchewan Order of Merit

Ex-Officio Member
 The Honourable Vaughn Solomon Schofield, S.O.M., S.V.M.

Ordinary members
 Raymond E. Ahenakew, S.O.M.
 Bruce W. Beatty, C.M., S.O.M., C.D. (1922- 2011) (posthumous)
 Sandra L. Birdsell, C.M., S.O.M.
 Dr. Barbara Keirnes Young, S.O.M.
 W. Thomas Molloy, O.C., S.O.M., Q.C., LL.B., LL.D.
 Dr. Brian G. Rossnagel, S.O.M.
 David A. Thauberger, C.M., S.O.M.
 W. Brett Wilson, C.M., S.O.M., LL.D

Military Valour Decorations

Star of Military Valour

 PRIVATE TAUMY ST-HILAIRE, S.M.V.

Medal of Military Valour

 CAPTAIN ASHLEY COLLETTE, M.M.V.
 SPECIALIST DAVID FLETCHER GRAVES, M.M.V., United States Army
 STAFF SERGEANT ADAM HEVER, M.M.V., United States Army
 CORPORAL ERIC MONNIN, M.M.V.
 MASTER CORPORAL CHARLES ST-PIERRE, M.M.V.
 LIEUTENANT GUILLAUME FRÉDÉRIC CARON, M.M.V., C.D. 
 CORPORAL BRADLEY D. CASEY, M.M.V. 
 CAPTAIN WILLIAM TODD FIELDING, M.M.V., C.D. 
 PRIVATE TONY RODNEY VANCE HARRIS, M.M.V. 
 MASTER CORPORAL ADAM HOLMES, M.M.V. 
 CAPTAIN MICHAEL A. MACKILLOP, M.M.V., C.D. 
 MASTER CORPORAL GILLES-REMI MIKKELSON, M.M.V. 
 PRIVATE PHILIP MILLAR, M.M.V. 
 MASTER CORPORAL PAUL DOUGLAS MITCHELL, M.M.V. 
 PRIVATE JOHN NELSON, M.M.V. 
 MASTER CORPORAL MARC-ANDRÉ J. M. ROUSSEAU, M.M.V. 
 SERGEANT GRAHAM MARC VERRIER, M.M.V., C.D.

Canadian Bravery Decorations

Star of Courage

 Corporal Joseph Martin Éric Beaudoin, C.D.
 Simon Bernier
 Marcel Bouffard
 Sergeant Randal Douglas McOrmond, C.D.
 Master Corporal Robin Anthony Richardson, C.D.
 Constable David Edgar
 Marc Fortier (Posthumous)
 Corporal Winston William Matheson, C.D.
 Constable Clayton Speers

Medal of Bravery

 David Edison Adams
 Constable Jennifer Elizabeth Anderson
 Jordan Adam Appleby
 Réal April
 Sergio Avaca
 Judith Gayle Barker
 Jason Bavelaar Jr.
 Master Corporal Christian Pierre Jonathan Bédard
 Pascal Bergeron
 Darrell Black
 Michael Black
 Bernard Joseph Blanchard
 Constable Jean-Pierre Brabant
 Justin Ashley Byrne
 Daniel Chrusch
 Constable Shaun Nicholas De Grandpré
 Provincial Constable Ken Leon Decloet
 Anthony Del Balso
 Kole Gerard Devisscher
 Adlene Fetni
 Vincent Bradley Fontaine
 Dwight Stephen Foster
 Michael Foster
 Sébastien Gilbert
 Daniel Glanville
 Jules Groulx-Swennen
 Philip Hall
 Doctor Ursula Higgins
 Gisèle Huot (posthumous)
 Constable Guillaume Jacques
 Raphaëlle Jetté
 Brent Kirchner
 Corporal Dale M. Kurdziel
 Aline L'Écuyer Lacroix
 Benoit Ladouceur
 Guillaume Langlois
 Claude Lapierre
 Tim Leclair
 Jeffery Thomas Ray Lennox
 Reno Levesque
 Peter Levy
 Russell Levy
 Gian Frank Mameli
 Eric Michael McAdam Manget
 Sergeant James Wesley McLaren
 Corporal Daniel Richard Melanson
 Birunthan Muralidaran (posthumous)
 Alexander Peter David Nassak
 Sergeant François Paquette
 Peter Edward Paquette
 Bruce Wayne Raymond
 David Rego
 Sergeant Scott Wesley Rempel
 Cynthia Louise Riediger (posthumous)
 Constable Simon Rivard
 Candace Irene Dawn Smith
 Doctor Kenneth W. Sniderman
 Daniel Sokolowski
 Constable Mark Tan
 Constable Mansoor Ahmad
 Paul George Akehurst
 Lauchlin Henry Alexander Armstrong
 John-Paul Bacon
 Lieutenant(N) André D. Bard, C.D.
 Joe Barefoot
 Éric Beaulieu 
 Constable Sandi Joanne Begg
 Tyler Bell-Morena
 François Bergeron 
 Paul Bergeron
 Michel Bérubé 
 Darren Jason Bieber 
 Constable Michael Allan Biron
 Freddy Borau
 James Joseph Bourgeois
 Eldred Burden Jr.
 Corporal Joseph Léandre Mickaël Couture
 Constable Peter C. Crouse
 Leading Seaman David J. S. Denman
 Constable Karen Mary Desaulniers
 Yves Ducharme
 Richard Dufresne
 Alexandre Duperré 
 Constable Michel Durocher
 Chief Warrant Officer Anthony Eric Fequet, C.D. (Retired)
 Sergeant Lorraine Fequet, C.D.
 Constable Avery Curt Flanagan
 Warrant Officer Marc Joseph Fortin, C.D. (Retired)
 Detective Constable Bradley William Fraser
 Sergeant Kent James Gulliford, M.S.M., C.D.
 Patrick Grondin 
 Michael John Hancock (Posthumous)
 Ernest John Herrfort
 Jonathan Hillgren 
 Mark Arthur Janke 
 Kevin I. Jelley-Kasper 
 Chad Khadr 
 Corporal Tamer Mahmoud Khadr 
 Gunter Lambeets
 Christopher Larkham
 Tyler Ross Laton 
 Christian Leblond
 Jonathan Yvan Leblond
 Daniel Magny
 Dawn Rene Manning
 Michel Massé 
 Jeff Sean McCarthy
 William John McKeag
 Jeremy Francis Michelin 
 Leading Seaman Patrick S. Moulden, C.D.
 Constable David Murtha
 Peter Nesbeth
 Constable Allen George Percival
 Jason William Phillips
 Constable Franco D. Pittui
 Wayne Pruden
 Constable Lindsy Richardson
 Master Corporal Daniel Edward Gilles Rochette, C.D.
 Sergeant Stéphane Réal Joseph Roy, C.D.
 George Cosmin Rusu
 Major Ryan Dennis Smid, C.D.
 Yves Soumillion
 Colleen Taylor
 David Wilbert Townsend
 Jacqueline Lorraine Vanderwood
 Constable Daryl Whitten
 Ronald Earl Walton

Meritorious Service Decorations

Meritorious Service Cross (Military Division)

 BRIGADIER-GENERAL KENNETH ANDRÉ CORBOULD, O.M.M., M.S.C., C.D.
 COLONEL DEAN JAMES MILNER, O.M.M., M.S.C., C.D.
 BRIGADIER-GENERAL CRAIG RANDALL KING, O.M.M., M.S.C., C.D., M.B.E.
 LIEUTENANT-COLONEL CONRAD JOSEPH JOHN MIALKOWSKI, M.S.C., C.D.
 BRIGADIER-GENERAL DAVID GORDON NEASMITH, O.M.M., M.S.C., C.D.
 MAJOR-GENERAL MICHAEL JAMES WARD, M.S.C., C.D.

 LIEUTENANT-GENERAL JOSEPH JACQUES CHARLES BOUCHARD, C.M.M., M.S.C., C.D.
 COLONEL CHRISTIAN DROUIN, M.S.C., C.D.

 BRIGADIER-GENERAL JOSEPH MARCEL MARQUIS HAINSE, M.S.C., C.D. 
 COLONEL SIMON CHARLES HETHERINGTON, M.S.C., C.D. 
 ADMIRAL MICHAEL GLENN MULLEN, M.S.C. (United States Navy)
 CHIEF WARRANT OFFICER SHAWN DOUGLAS STEVENS, M.S.C., M.S.M., C.D. 

 BRIGADIER-GENERAL JONATHAN HOLBERT VANCE, O.M.M., M.S.C., C.D. 
 CHIEF WARRANT OFFICER JOSEPH SIMON ARMAND VINET, M.M.M., M.S.C., C.D.
 LIEUTENANT-COLONEL FRANCIS JEROME WALSH, M.S.C., C.D. 

 ADMIRAL JAMES ALEXANDER WINNEFELD, JR., M.S.C. (United States Navy)

Meritorious Service Medal (Military Division)
 SERGEANT JOSEPH CLAUDE PATRICK AUGER, M.S.M., C.D.
 CHIEF WARRANT OFFICER JOSEPH MARIO CLAUDE BELCOURT, M.M.M., M.S.M., C.D.
 COLONEL GÉRARD JOSEPH BLAIS, M.S.M., C.D.
 LIEUTENANT-COLONEL DAVID BRUCE COCHRANE, M.S.M., C.D.
 MASTER WARRANT OFFICER JOSEPH YVON PRUDENT CLAUDE DALLAIRE, M.S.M., C.D.
 MAJOR RAYMOND JEAN FRANÇOIS DUFAULT, M.S.M., C.D.
 LIEUTENANT-COLONEL JOHN WILLIAM ERRINGTON, M.S.M., C.D.
 HONORARY CAPTAIN(N) THE HONOURABLE MYRA AVA FREEMAN, C.M., O.N.S., M.S.M.
 MAJOR ÉTIENNE JOSEPH ROBERT CLAUDE GAUTHIER, M.S.M., C.D.
 COLONEL RICHARD JOSEPH GIGUÈRE, M.S.M., C.D.
 CORPORAL HOPE GINGRICH, M.S.M.
 COLONEL JOSEPH PIERRE HERVÉ HERCULE GOSSELIN, M.S.M., C.D.
 CHIEF WARRANT OFFICER JOSEPH LUCIEN ÉRIC GRAVEL, M.M.M., M.S.M., C.D.
 CHIEF WARRANT OFFICER ALAIN GRENIER, M.M.M., M.S.M., C.D.
 LIEUTENANT-COMMANDER AARON GYORKOS, M.S.M., C.D.
 MAJOR JOSEPH ANTONIO MARCEL LOUIS HAMEL, M.S.M., C.D.
 COLONEL JEFFREY ALLEN HAUSMANN, M.S.M., United States Air Force
 COMMANDER SIMON RUPERT HUGHES, M.S.M., C.D.
 LIEUTENANT-COMMANDER STEWART THOMAS HUGHES, M.S.M., C.D.
 LIEUTENANT-COLONEL ROBERT EDWARD KEARNEY, M.S.M., C.D.
 COLONEL PATRICK KELLY, M.S.M., C.D.
 MAJOR JEAN ÉRIC LANDRY, M.S.M., C.D.
 WARRANT OFFICER DANIEL PIUS MANSFIELD, M.S.M., C.D.
 MAJOR JEAN-CHRISTIAN MARQUIS, M.S.M., C.D.
 MAJOR CHRISTOPHER ALAN MCKENNA, M.S.M., C.D.
 MAJOR-GENERAL CHRISTOPHER D. MILLER, M.S.M., United States Air Force
 WARRANT OFFICER DAVID ELWELL MILLIGAN, M.S.M., C.D.
 CAPTAIN JOSEPH GUY NOURY, M.S.M., C.D.
 MASTER CORPORAL MARTIN JOSEPH ANDRÉ PELLETIER, M.S.M.
 COLONEL JACQUES PAUL ROBERT PRÉVOST, M.S.M., C.D.
 CAPTAIN(N) ALEXANDER FRANZ GEORG RUEBEN, M.S.M., C.D.
 CORPORAL SCOTT SCHOLTEN, M.S.M., C.D.
 LIEUTENANT-COLONEL ÉRICK DAVID SIMONEAU, M.S.M., C.D.
 LIEUTENANT-COLONEL MASON JAMES STALKER, M.S.M., C.D.
 LIEUTENANT-COLONEL MICHEL-HENRI ST-LOUIS, M.S.M., C.D.
 MAJOR RICHARD CIMON TURNER, M.S.M., C.D.
 COLONEL SIEGFRIED USAL, M.S.M., French Air Force
 CHIEF WARRANT OFFICER KEVIN CHARLES WEST, M.S.M., C.D.
 LIEUTENANT-COLONEL CHRISTOPHER JOHN ZIMMER, M.S.M., C.D.
 MAJOR DEREK JOHN ADAMS, M.S.M., C.D.
 MAJOR JOSEPH AIMÉ DANIEL AUGER, M.S.M., C.D.
 LIEUTENANT-COLONEL MALCOLM DAVID BRUCE, M.S.M., C.D.
 SERGEANT YANNICK CAMPBELL, M.S.M., C.D.

 MAJOR GENERAL RAYMOND CARPENTER, M.S.M., United States Army National Guard
 COLONEL MICHAEL PEARSON CESSFORD, O.M.M., M.S.M., C.D.
 MASTER WARRANT OFFICER JOSEPH GUY ALAIN RICHMOND CHAMPAGNE, M.S.M., C.D.
 MAJOR MICHAEL JAMES COLE, M.S.M., C.D.
 COLONEL IAN ROBERT CREIGHTON, M.S.M., C.D.
 SERGEANT GORDON PERCY CULLEN, M.S.M., C.D.
 CAPTAIN CHRISTOPHER GLEN CYR, M.S.M.
 MAJOR AUSTIN MATTHEW DOUGLAS, M.S.M., C.D.
 SERGEANT SCOTT WILLIAM DUFFY, M.S.M., C.D.
 WARRANT OFFICER MARC CHARLES JOSEPH FILIATRAULT, M.S.M., C.D.
 CORPORAL JOY FRANCIS, M.S.M.
 MAJOR DOUGLAS ANDREW GRANT, M.S.M., C.D.
 MAJOR STEVE JOURDAIN, M.S.M., C.D.
 COLONEL FREDERICK LEWIS, M.S.M., C.D.
 LIEUTENANT-COLONEL SCOTT GERARD LONG, M.S.M., C.D.
 CAPTAIN VINCENT LUSSIER, M.S.M.
 MAJOR HEATHER JOY MACCHARLES, M.S.M., C.D.
 LIEUTENANT-COLONEL TIMOTHY DAVID MARCELLA, M.S.M., C.D.
 HONORARY LIEUTENANT-COLONEL JAMES WILLIAM MARTIN, M.S.M., C.D.
 COLONEL JOHN GERARD MILNE, M.S.M., C.D.
 MAJOR JEFFREY KARL MONAGHAN, M.S.M., C.D.
 CHIEF WARRANT OFFICER KIRK NEWHOOK, M.S.M., C.D.
 MAJOR STEPHEN NOEL, M.S.M., C.D.
 LIEUTENANT-COLONEL PAUL JAMES PEYTON, M.S.M., C.D.
 LIEUTENANT-COLONEL JOSEPH RAYNALD YAN POIRIER, M.S.M., C.D.
 MASTER CORPORAL JEFFREY QUESNELLE, M.S.M.
 CORPORAL COREY SAGSTUEN, M.S.M., C.D.
 CAPTAIN MARK SAVARD, M.S.M.
 SERGEANT MICHEL SIMONEAU, M.S.M., C.D.
 CHIEF WARRANT OFFICER KEVIN PETER SINDEN, M.S.M., C.D.

 LIEUTENANT-GENERAL JACK CALVIN STULTZ, M.S.M., United States Army Reserve
 MAJOR ELEANOR FRANCES TAYLOR, M.S.M., C.D.
 LIEUTENANT CHAD THAIN, M.S.M.
 SERGEANT KEVIN DONALD SCOTT WHITE, M.S.M., C.D.
 LIEUTENANT-COLONEL RONALD ALLAN ALLISON, M.S.M., C.D. 
 COLONEL DAVID EDWARD BARR, M.S.M., C.D. 
 MAJOR ANNIE BOUCHARD, M.S.M., C.D. 
 MASTER CORPORAL DANNY DENIS BOYD, M.S.M., C.D. 
 COLONEL SHANE ANTHONY BRENNAN, M.S.M., C.D. 
 MASTER WARRANT OFFICER RAYMOND JOSEPH BRODEUR, M.S.M., C.D. 
 CORPORAL BOBBY BROWN, M.S.M. 
 LIEUTENANT-COLONEL KENNETH FREEMAN BUTTERWORTH, M.S.M., C.D. 
 LIEUTENANT-COLONEL MARIE ANNABELLE JENNIE CARIGNAN, M.S.M., C.D. 
 CAPTAIN BREEN CARSON, M.S.M. 
 LIEUTENANT-COLONEL DAVID BRUCE COCHRANE, M.S.M., C.D. 
 CORPORAL ERIC DANIEL DIONNE, M.S.M. 
 COLONEL JAMES ROY FORESTELL, M.S.M., C.D. 
 WARRANT OFFICER JOSEPH JACQUES FRIOLET, M.S.M., C.D. 
 COLONEL RAYMOND MARC GAGNÉ, M.S.M., C.D. 
 LIEUTENANT-COMMANDER LOUIS CHRISTIAN HACHÉ, M.S.M., C.D. 
 CAPTAIN(N) RICHARD PHILIP HARRISON, O.M.M., M.S.M., C.D. 
 COLONEL JEFFREY HOLACHEK, M.S.M. 
 MAJOR JAY LYMAN INDEWEY, M.S.M., C.D. 
 MAJOR MICHAEL KAISER, M.S.M., C.D. 
 CAPTAIN ENNO ALEXANDER KERCKHOFF, M.S.M., C.D. 
 MASTER WARRANT OFFICER RENÉ KIENS, M.S.M., C.D. 
 MAJOR PATRICK JOHN KOCH, M.S.M., C.D. 
 LIEUTENANT-COLONEL DAVID WILLIAM LOWTHIAN, M.S.M., C.D. 
 MAJOR STEVEN KELLY MACBETH, M.S.M., C.D. 
 MAJOR JOSHUA JAMES MAJOR, M.S.M., C.D. 
 MASTER WARRANT OFFICER KEVIN JAMES MATHERS, M.S.M., C.D. 
 LIEUTENANT-COLONEL THOMAS FREDERICK MCGRATH, O.M.M., M.S.M., C.D. 
 CAPTAIN JAMES HUGH MCKAY, M.S.M. 
 SERGEANT KEVIN MENDIOROZ, M.S.M., C.D. 
 MAJOR LEE JAMES MOSSOP, M.S.M., C.D. 
 LIEUTENANT-COLONEL DAVID CHRISTOPHER MURPHY, M.S.M., C.D. 
 CAPTAIN(N) JOHN FREDERICK NEWTON, M.S.M., C.D. 
 MAJOR WAYNE KENNETH NIVEN, M.S.M., C.D.
 LIEUTENANT ANDREW RICHARD NUTTALL, M.S.M. (Posthumous) 
 CAPTAIN JAMES ALAN O'NEILL, M.S.M., C.D. 
 WARRANT OFFICER STEEVE OUELLET, M.S.M., C.D. 
 WARRANT OFFICER GEORGE NELSON PARROTT, M.S.M., C.D. 
 LIEUTENANT-COLONEL MICHAEL BRIAN PATRICK, M.S.M., C.D. 
 CAPTAIN(N) KENNETH JOHN PICKFORD, M.S.M., C.D. 
 MASTER WARRANT OFFICER DEAN EDWARD POFFLEY, M.S.M., C.D. 
 MAJOR DEREK PROHAR, M.M.V., M.S.M. 
 CHIEF WARRANT OFFICER JOSEPH CAMILLE ROBICHAUD, M.S.M., C.D. 
 MAJOR LIAM WADE RUTLAND, M.S.M., C.D. 
 CORPORAL JOHN TOMMY SALOIS, M.S.M. 
 LIEUTENANT-COLONEL ANDREW SCHEIDL, M.S.M., C.D.
 CAPTAIN ROBERT SCOTT, M.S.M. 
 MAJOR DONALD JAMES SENFT, M.S.M., C.D. 
 LIEUTENANT-COLONEL JEFFERY DOUGLAS SMYTH, M.S.M., C.D. 
 HONORARY COLONEL GARY CHRIS SOLAR, M.S.M., C.D. 
 CHIEF PETTY OFFICER 2ND CLASS DAVID SYDNEY TOBIAS, M.S.M., C.D. 
 CAPTAIN KRISTIAN UDESEN, M.S.M. 
 COMMANDER STEVEN MICHAEL WADDELL, M.S.M., C.D. 
 CAPTAIN(N) CRAIG WALKINGTON, M.S.M., C.D. 
 SERGEANT AUSTIN KANE WILLIAMS, M.S.M. 

 BRIGADIER-GENERAL PAUL FRANCIS WYNNYK, O.M.M., M.S.M., C.D. 
 BRIGADIER-GENERAL GREGORY ACHILLES YOUNG, O.M.M., M.S.M., C.D.

Secret appointments
 4 August 2012: Nine others whose names are withheld for operational and security reasons.

Mentions in Dispatches
 Corporal Daniel Albrecht
 Master Warrant Officer Timothy Alfred Bennett, C.D.
 Major Steven Gary Brown, C.D.
 Master Corporal Joel Douglas Chidley
 Master Corporal Jason Clark, C.D.
 Private Joshua Clouston
 Sergeant Gareth Davey, C.D.
 Master Seaman Marc Robert Essertaize, C.D.
 Master Corporal Devon Hatcher
 Corporal Christopher Hinds
 Warrant Officer John Charles Hryniw, C.D.
 Corporal Stephan Leblanc, C.D.
 Major Christian Donald Lillington, C.D.
 Master Corporal John Lougheed
 Captain Adam Mramor
 Private Valerie Noel
 Private Christopher Palubicki
 Master Warrant Officer Kenneth Thomas Joseph Pichie, C.D.
 Private Kirk Powell
 Warrant Officer Paul Maurice Primeau, C.D.
 Corporal Christopher Roy
 Corporal Richard Stewart
 Master Corporal Martin Amyot
 Corporal Joshua Antonia
 Captain Breen Carson
 Corporal Neil Dancer
 Corporal Andrew Paul Downer
 Master Corporal Evan Duff
 Sergeant Patrick Michael Farrell, C.D.
 Private Kirk Farrell
 Corporal Joseph Don Henry
 Corporal Shaun Hofer
 Major Robert Mathew Hume, C.D.
 Sergeant Jedd Michael Lafleche
 Sergeant James Ray Brent Martin, C.D.
 Master Corporal Ian R. Matthews-Pestana
 Master Corporal Stuart Douglas Murray, C.D.
 Corporal Christopher Joseph Novak
 Lieutenant Brian Riddell
 Corporal Corey Sagstuen, C.D.
 Warrant Officer Lawrence Jeffrey Schnurr, C.D.
 Sergeant Michel Simoneau, C.D.
 Master Corporal Jayson Swift
 Lieutenant Matthew Tompkins

Secret appointment
 11 February 2012: One other whose name is withheld for operational and security reasons.
 4 August 2012: One other whose name is withheld for operational and security reasons.

Commonwealth and Foreign Orders, Decorations and Medal awarded to Canadians

From Her Majesty The Queen in Right of Australia

Honorary Member of the Order of Australia
 Ms. Anne Raymond (posthumous)

From Her Majesty The Queen in Right of the United Kingdom

Commander of the Most Excellent Order of the British Empire
 Dr. Robert Frederick (Fred) Mulder

Member of the Most Excellent Order of the British Empire
 Inspector Joseph Andrew Arsenault

Operational Service Medal (Afghanistan)
 Private Mario Santos Duarte

From the President of the Republic of Austria

Decoration of Merit (Gold)
 Mr. Eric Bissell

Austrian Decoration for Science and Art
 Professor Ian Hacking

From His Majesty The King of the Belgians

Grand Officer of the Order of the Crown
 The Honourable Peter G. MacKay

From His Majesty The Sultan and Yang Di-Pertuan of Brunei Darussalam

Meritorious Service Medal
 Dr. Roger Neil Lawrey

From the President of the Republic of Finland

Cross of Merit of the White Rose of Finland
 Mr. Vilho Kalervo Vuorensivu

From the President of the French Republic

Officer of the National Order of the Legion of Honour
 Ms. Helen Vari
 Lieutenant-General Charles Bouchard

Knight of the National Order of the Legion of Honour
 Mr. James Doak
 Mr. Paul Desmarais, Jr.
 Ms. Monique Leroux
 Ms. Marie-Lucie Morin

Grand Officer of the National Order of Merit
 Ms. Monique Colette

Commander of the National Order of Merit
 Mr. Denis Brière
 Mr. Claude Roquet

Knight of the National Order of Merit
 Brigadier-General Frederick George Bigelow
 Lieutenant-Colonel André M. Levesque (retired)
 Mr. Benoît Pelletier

Officer of the Order of the Academic Palms
 Mr. Louis-Edmond Hamelin

Knight of the Order of the Academic Palms
 Mr. Jean-Claude Boulanger
 Mr. Guy Breton
 Mr. Marcel Proulx
 Ms. Monique Cormier

National Defence Medal, Gold Echelon with clasp "Gendarmerie nationale"
 Captain Claude Germain Jr.
 Chief Inspector Claude Levac

National Defence Medal, Gold Echelon with Infantry clasp
 Colonel Keith Lawrence

From the President of the Federal Republic of Germany

Grand Cross 1st Class of the Order of Merit
 The Honourable Peter Andrew Stewart Milliken

Officer's Cross of the Order of Merit of the Federal Republic of Germany
 Professor Carl Gerard Amrhein

Silver Cross of Honour of the Bundeswehr
 Major Edmund Roberds

From the President of the Republic of Honduras

Grand Cross of the Order of San Francisco Morazán
 Mr. Neil Reeder

From the President of the Italian Republic

Grand Officer of the Order of Merit of the Italian Republic
 Mr. Wilfrid Wilkinson

Officer of the Order of Merit of the Italian Republic
 Mr. Alberto Leone
 Mr. Antonio Porretta
 Mr. Lucio Sacchetti

Knight of the Order of Merit of the Italian Republic
 Mr. Anthony C. Masi
 Ms. Maria Rosaria (Mariella) Pandolfi
 Mr. Nunzio Tumino
 Mr. Biagio "Gino" Fallone
 Mr. Giovanni Rapana

Grand Officer of the Order of the Star of Solidarity
 Mr. Blair Hankey

Commander of the Order of the Star of Solidarity
 Mr. Elio Costa
 Mr. Marcello Danesi
 Mr. Antonio Franceschetti
 Mr. Anthony Lacavera
 Mr. Domenico Pietropaolo

Knight of the Order of the Star of Solidarity
 Mr. Pierre Jutras
 Mr. Steven Muzzo
 Mr. Alfonso Ciasca
 Ms. Filomena Frisina
 Ms. Maria Domenica Cesta
 Mr. Mario Chieffo
 Mr. Elio De Lauri
 Ms. Gemma Favero Scotton
 Mr. David Gordon Franklin
 Mr. Pietro Girardi
 Mrs. Carmela Liparoti
 Mr. David Shannon

From His Majesty The Emperor of Japan

Order of the Rising Sun, Gold Rays with Neck Ribbon
 Mr. Arthur Tsuneo Wakabayashi

Order of the Rising Sun, Gold and Silver Rays
 Mr. Mistugi Kikuchi

From the President of Latvia

Order of the Three Stars, Category 5
 Mr. Laimons Ozols
 Mr. Varimants Pludons

From the President of Malaysia

Medal of the Order of the Defender of the Realm (Pingat Pangkuan Negara)
 Ms. Sui Toh Ting (Lucy)

From Her Majesty The Queen of the Netherlands

Knight of the Order of Orange Nassau
 Mr. Gauke Cornelis Jan de Jonge

From the Secretary General of the North Atlantic Treaty Organisation

NATO Meritorious Service Medal
 Lieutenant-Colonel Paul D. Fleet
 Major Sylvain Gazaille
 Lieutenant-Colonel Doug Grimshaw
 Master Warrant Officer Lewis H. Johnstone
 Master Warrant Officer Lorraine Pilon

From the President of the Republic of Poland

Commander's Cross of the Order of Merit of the Republic of Poland
 Mr. Krzysztof Korwin-Kuczynski

Officer's Cross of the Order of Merit of the Republic of Poland
 Mr. Mieczyslaw Librowicz
 Mr. Wiktor Askanas
 Mr. Edward Whitley (posthumous)
 Major-General David A. Fraser (Retired)

Knight's Cross of the Order of Merit of the Republic of Poland
 Mr. Krzysztof Tomczak
 Mr. Jan Szymanski
 Mr. Piotr Nawrot

Gold Cross of Merit of the Republic of Poland
 Mr. Józef Gola
 Mr. Tadeusz Lis
 Ms. Barbara Séguin
 Mrs. Emilia Pohl
 Mr. Leszek Galko
 Mr. Tomasz Grasza

Silver Cross of Merit
 Mr. Pierre Jutras
 Ms. Miroslawa Suchecka
 Mr. Tadeusz Barnowski
 Mrs. Jadwiga Gacek
 Mrs. Krystyna Szydlowska

From the President of the Russian Federation

Ushakov Medal
 Mr. Real J. DeGuire
 Mr. Kenneth J. Philbin
 Mr. Thomas D. W. McCulloch
 Mr. W. B. Deedo
 Mr. Arthur Hills
 Mr. F. Wm. Macdonell
 Mr. J. G. Calfat
 Mr. Claude Edward Joyal
 Mr. Donald McAdam
 Mr. Donald D. Gregor
 Mr. Dougald M. Lamb
 Mr. Howard Hazzard
 Mr. Thomas Arnott Whitefield
 Mr. John Tonks
 Mr. Harold McNairn
 Mr. Gilbert Fraser
 Mr. Robert Thomas Grogan
 Mr. James Dykes
 Mr. Millard Arthur Keith
 Mr. James William Galloway
 Mr. George Brown
 Mr. Richard Henry
 Mr. Frederick G. Pangborn
 Mr. Richard Green
 Mr. William McNutt
 Mr. Reynold Marshall
 Mr. John Murphy
 Mr. Archibald Ross
 Mr. Lloyd Bergstrom
 Mr. Leonard Martyn
 Mr. Gilbert J. Kenny
 Mr. Uziel Adler Abramovich
 Mr. James Stewart
 Mr. Wesley John Kaufman
 Mr. Ronald W. Carrol
 Mr. Andrew Gillespie
 Mr. Alfred M. Porter
 Mr. William R. Nicoll
 Mr. Paul B. Coombs
 Mr. Bill Easton
 Mr. Gordon Blair
 Mr. Ward Mortenson
 Mr. William F. Palmer
 Mr. Warren Miles
 Mr. John Lonergan
 Mr. Garfield Harris
 Mr. J. Walter McNeish
 Mr. Andrew J. Lucas
 Mr. William Georgeson
 Mr. Quentin D. Jacks
 Mr. Thomas H. Parker
 Mr. George Foot
 Mr. John Gordon Quinn
 Mr. Christopher Bolger
 Mr. Wallace L. Beaver
 Mr. Harold Nelson Watts
 Mr. Alan S. May
 Mr. Alexander G. MacLachlan
 Mr. Richard Richardson
 Mr. John Harmer
 Mr. R. W. Parkin
 Mr. Eric Stott
 Mr. Bayard Galbraith
 Mr. John MacNeil
 Mr. J. A. Irvine
 Mr. William Herbert Atkinson
 Mr. Alex Polovin
 Mr. Jack Hendrie
 Mr. David Kirby
 Mr. James Sisler

From His Majesty The King of Spain

Cross of the Order of Civil Merit
 Mr. Robert R. Fowler
 Mr. Louis Guay
 Mr. Albert Edwin Honeywell

From the President of the United States of America

Commander of the Legion of Merit
 General Walter J. Natynczyk

Officer of the Legion of Merit
  Colonel Martin P. Galvin
 Colonel Todd Nelson Balfe
 Major-General Stuart A. Beare
 Lieutenant-General Charles Bouchard
 Brigadier-General Dean J. Milner
 Colonel Steven J. R. Whelan
 Brigadier-General James Ferron
 Major-General Pierre J. Forgues
 Brigadier-General David G. Neasmith
 Brigadier-General Eric G. Tremblay
 Brigadier-General Peter J. Atkinson

Second award of an officership of the Legion of Merit
 Lieutenant-General Charles Bouchard

Bronze Star Medal
 Lieutenant-Colonel Timothy M. Datchko
 Major Annette M. Dombrowski
 Lieutenant-Colonel William P. J. Graydon
 Major Stephen G. Hale
 Colonel Acton L. Kilby
 Lieutenant-Colonel Craig S. Landry
 Chief Warrant Officer Daniel T. Moyer
 Colonel David A. Patterson
 Lieutenant-Colonel Ronald A. Puddister
 Master Warrant Officer J. P. Jean-Claude Senecal
 Lieutenant-Colonel M. James Stalker
 Lieutenant-Colonel J. H. M. Pierre St-Laurent
 Lieutenant-Colonel Michael R. Voith
 Lieutenant-Commander David P. Fahey
 Major Ralf J. Hennig
 Lieutenant-Commander Stephan J. A. Julien
 Lieutenant-Colonel Terence J. Leigh
 Major Peter S. Fedak
 Captain Travis G. Sherriff

Meritorious Service Medal, First Gold Star
 Lieutenant-Colonel Patrick H. McAdam

Meritorious Service Medal, First Oak Leaf Cluster
 Lieutenant-Colonel Lawrence James Zaporzan
 Lieutenant-Colonel William N. Franklin

Meritorious Service Medal
 Lieutenant-Colonel Brook G. Bangsboll
 Lieutenant-Colonel Paul J. Doyle
 Lieutenant-Colonel Timothy J. Garriock
 Major Marie Ryan-Roberts
 Major Joseph André Pierre Viens
 Lieutenant-Commander Michael J. Barefoot
 Major C. Allan Champion
 Captain Erik D. Deneau
 Lieutenant-Commander Robert A. Forbes
 Lieutenant-Commander Stephan P. King
 Captain(N) Kurt N. Salchert
 Colonel Paul E. Scagnetti
 Major Ralph H. Urzinger
 Lieutenant-Colonel Brigid White Dooley-Tremblay
 Colonel Charles S. Hamel
 Captain Kendra Ann Hartery
 Major Sherry A. MacLeod
 Major Kazimir T. Oreziak
 Lieutenant-Colonel Paul J. Peyton
 Chief Warrant Officer Gabriel Chartier
 Colonel Patrick Kelly
 Chief Warrant Officer Daniel T. Moyer
 Lieutenant-Colonel Warren A. Rego
 Chief Petty Officer 1st Class Trevor J. Spring
 Lieutenant-Colonel Nicolas Stanton
 Major Jean-François Tremblay
 Colonel Ronald Ubbens
 Major Ross B. Allan
 Major Randall A. Smyth
 Major-General Christine Whitecross
 Lieutenant-Colonel Christopher S. Allen

Air Medal
 Major J. Sylvester Abbott
 Major Richard A. J. Jolette
 Warrant Officer Robert B. McKendry
 Major Bruce P. Barnes

Erratums of Commonwealth and Foreign Orders, Decorations and Medal awarded to Canadians

Correction of 30 June 2012
 The notice published on page 1212 of the April 28, 2012, issue of the Canada Gazette, Part I, is hereby amended as follows: From the President of the French Republic, the National Defence Medal, Silver Echelon with Infantry clasp to Colonel Keith Lawrence

Correction of 28 July 2012
 The notice published on page 1776 of the June 30, 2012 issue of the Canada Gazette, Part I, is hereby amended as follows: From His Majesty The Emperor of Japan, the Order of the Rising Sun, Gold and Silver Rays to Mr. Mitsugi Kikuchi

Correction of 24 November 2012
 The notice published on page 2676 of the September 22, 2012 issue of the Canada Gazette, Part I, is hereby amended as follows: From the President of the Russian Federation, the Ushakov Medal to Mr. Ryland Marshall.

References 

Monarchy in Canada